Dominik Humbel is a Swiss orienteering competitor and world champion. He won a gold medal at the 1993 World Orienteering Championships in West Point with the Swiss relay team (Christian Aebersold, Urs Flühmann and Thomas Bührer).

References

External links
 
 

Living people
Year of birth missing (living people)
Swiss orienteers
Male orienteers
Foot orienteers
World Orienteering Championships medalists
Swiss mountain runners